Maior (also spelled major) (Latin, 'greater') gives its name to several occupations such as maior domus, major, and mayor, and thus many surnames, especially German surnames like Maier, Meier, Meyer, Meir, Mayer, Meyr, and the Dutch surname Meijer.

Notable people with the name Maior include:

People
 Maior of Arabia, (3rd-century) Roman sophist and rhetorician 
 Álvaro Luiz Maior de Aquino, (born 1977), Brazilian footballer
 Augustin Maior (1882-1963), Romanian physicist
 George Maior (born 1967), Romanian politician and espionage chief
 Grigore Maior (1715-1785), Romanian bishop
 Petru Maior (1756-1821), Romanian writer and priest

See also

 Major (disambiguation)

Romanian-language surnames